George Atherton may refer to:

 George W. Atherton (1837–1906), American soldier and educator 
 G. F. A. Atherton (George F. A. Atherton, 1790–1882), American state level politician from Wisconsin
 Gee Atherton (George David Atherton, born 1985), English racing cyclist

See also
 George Atherton Aitken (1860–1917), British civil servant, author, scholar and a literary biographer